Running on Empty (released in America as Fast Lane Fever) is a 1982 Australian action film. Shot in Canbelligo, Cobar and Sydney in New South Wales, Australia.

Plot
HE'LL WIN AT ANY COST

Fox is a young man that lives in the fast lane. He believes he is the fastest man on the road - but street racing is illegal. If he doesn't accept his latest challenge he could lose his girl...he could lose his life. Living dangerously, living fast and winning at any cost is their obsession. They don't turn back, they don't give in...and they don't ask for help.

Cast
In order as per the dvd credits
 Bob Barrett as Workman
 Warren Blondell as Lee
 Grahame Bond as Jagger
 Ric Carter as Country Boy
 Deborah Conway as Julie
 Max Cullen as Rebel
 Jon Darling as Workman
 Peter Davies as Ram's Mate
 Mervyn Drake as Country Boy
 Kristoffer Greaves as Starter
 Paul Johnstone as Lecherous Garage Attendant
 Penne Hackforth-Jones as Dave
 Chris Haywood as Photographer
 Maurice Hughes as Foreman
 Tim McLean as Photographer's Assistant
 Brian McNevin as Fox's Timer
 Richard Moir as Fox
 Vangelis Mourikis as Tony
 Sno Norton-Sinclair as Starter's Mate
 Robin Ramsay as Dad
 Geoff Rhoe as Ram
 Keli Roberts as Sheryl
 Anne Semler as Joan
 Jeff Truman as Country Boy
 Terry Serio as Mike
 Jacki Simmons as Nurse
 Gerrard Sont as Victor

Cars
 Ford Falcon GTHO Phase III
 Dodge Challenger
 57 Chevy

Production
The film was funded partly by the Film Corporation of Western Australia. It was filmed in Canbelligo (a small village near Cobar NSW), Cobar and surrounds, and Sydney NSW.

Box office
Running on Empty grossed $1,218,000 at the box office in Australia, which is equivalent to $3,544,880 in 2009 dollars.

See also
 Cinema of Australia

References

External links
 
 
 Running on Empty at Oz Movies
 Running on Empty at the National Film and Sound Archive

Running On Empty
Australian coming-of-age drama films
Running On Empty
Australian auto racing films
Films about blind people
1980s action drama films
1982 drama films
1980s coming-of-age drama films
1980s English-language films